Sincerely is the debut album of American electronic music recording artist Stephen, released on May 10, 2016.

Track listing
All songs produced by Stephen Swartz.

References

2016 debut albums